Mogadishu is the debut play by ex-school teacher Vivienne Franzmann concerning a white teacher who tries to protect her black student from expulsion after he pushes her to the ground. In order to protect himself, the student lies and drags her into a vortex of lies in which victim becomes perpetrator. The play was first produced by Royal Exchange Theatre in Manchester before it was transferred to the Lyric Theatre in Hammersmith, London. It was one of four joint winners of the Bruntwood Playwriting Competition in 2008 and the George Devine Award for most promising playwright in 2011.

Plot summary 

In a tough London secondary school, a teacher named Amanda is pushed to the ground by a black student named Jason when she tries to intervene in a fight between Jason and a younger foreign student named Firat. Ignoring the advice of her daughter, Becky, to report the incident, Amanda resists telling the headmaster, Chris, for fear of ruining Jason's future. Knowing Jason's history, one which she refuses to reveal to Becky, Amanda feels sorry for Jason. Finally persuaded, the next day she mentions the incident to Chris who is suspicious of why she has waited so long.

In the meantime, Jason has enlisted his on-and-off girlfriend Dee and his friends Chug, Saif, Jordan and Chloe to back up his story that Amanda pushed him first and racially abused him. They are hesitant at first but soon change their minds; Chris is forced to take the claims seriously and sends Amanda home. Becky is enraged at their lies and turns to her black stepfather, Peter, to tell Amanda to take the situation seriously and contact her union. Refusing to blow the situation out of proportion, Amanda does nothing and is soon suspended when the kids stick to their stories. Even Firat claims that he didn't see what happened.

Amanda feels betrayed by Chris and above all by Jason. Chris calls Jason and his father into school. Jason's father turns out to be quite an intimidating figure; after getting Jason's assurance that he is telling the truth, he demands to know why Chris has not yet reported the incident to the police. Chris agrees to do so. Jason asks his friends to go to the police to volunteer a statement against Amanda and they eventually agree to do so. While waiting late at night for a phone call to tell him what happened at the police station, Jason is interrupted by his father. His father is furious over breaking the house rules regarding late night phone calls. His father answers a call from Dee and tells her that Jason wets the bed.

Under severe pressure from Becky, Amanda admits that she feels sorry for Jason because his mother killed herself. Becky begs Firas to tell Chris that he saw Amanda get pushed; he agrees and tells the friends this. Jason is furious and he suspects that they did not really go to the police. After a fight where he slaps Dee, they desert him. Becky confronts Jason alone in the playground and reveals that her own father killed himself, hanging himself with a Homer Simpson tie she had given him for Christmas. Jason is cold toward this revelation, even when she reveals scars across her legs and arms from self-harm. They argue furiously and Becky taunts him over his dead mother.

The friends, led by Dee, admit to having lied to Chris, who can then drop the charges. Jason is seen in his house making a noose for himself in the kitchen and hanging himself. Amanda returns to school but, betrayed by the system she put so much faith in, she refuses to accept Dee's apology and tells Chris that she does not want to return to school anymore.

Reception 
The play premiered at the Royal Exchange in Manchester before transferring to the Lyric Theatre in Hammersmith, London. The London production used the same in-the-round design by Tom Scutt as the Manchester show. It received generally very favourable reviews with Dominic Cavendish of The Telegraph saying, "The play of the year? In my book, quite possibly", although some voices found it fundamentally racist.

Cast

References

British plays
Plays about race and ethnicity
2011 plays
Plays set in London